Kennedy Cherrington (born 5 January 1999) is an Australian rugby league and rugby union footballer who plays as a  for Parramatta Eels in the NRL Women's Premiership and the Cronulla-Sutherland Sharks in the NSWRL Women's Premiership.

She previously played rugby union for the NSW Waratahs in the Super W. Also represented Australia at the 2017 Youth Commonwealth Games in the Bahamas. Where her Australian U18s team won Gold. She then represented the Australian Women’s 7s side 2 more times at the 2018 Oceania Games (Fiji) winning Gold and the 2019 Pacific Games (Samoa) winning Silver.

Background
Born in Sydney, Cherrington grew up in Perth, Western Australia, where she began playing rugby league for the Rockingham Sharks in 2009. Before switching to rugby union in high school when deemed ineligible to continue playing with the boys after U12s. 

Cherrington's uncle, Norm Berryman, was a professional rugby union player who played one Test for the All Blacks. Her cousins, Anthony and Manaia Cherrington, are former professional rugby league players who both played in the National Rugby League.

Playing career

Rugby union
In 2017, Cherrington represented the Australian rugby sevens team at the Commonwealth Youth Games in The Bahamas, winning a gold medal.

In 2018, Cherrington joined the NSW Waratahs in the Super W, starting at centre in their 16–13 Grand Final win over the Queensland Reds. In 2019, she came off the bench in the Waratahs' 8–5 Super W Grand Final win over Queensland.

In November 2019, she was a member of the Australia A squad that toured Fiji. In 2020, she began the season playing for the Waratahs before the season was cancelled due to the COVID-19 pandemic.

Rugby league
In 2020, Cherrington returned to rugby league, joining the Cronulla-Sutherland Sharks in the NSWRL Women's Premiership. On 22 September 2020, she was announced as a member of the Sydney Roosters NRL Women's Premiership team.

In Round 1 of the 2020 NRL Women's season, she made her debut for the Roosters in an 18–4 win over the St George Illawarra Dragons. On 19 October 2019, she was named the NRLW Rookie of the Year. On 25 October 2020, she came off the bench in the Roosters' 10–20 Grand Final loss to the Brisbane Broncos.

On 28 October 2020, Cherrington was named in the New South Wales State of Origin squad but did not play in their 18–24 loss to Queensland. On 20 February 2021, she represented the Māori All Stars in their 24–0 win over the Indigenous All Stars.

Achievements and accolades

Individual
NRLW Rookie of the Year: 2020

References

External links
Sydney Roosters profile

1999 births
Living people
Australian sportspeople of Samoan descent
New Zealand Māori rugby league players
Australian female rugby union players
Australian female rugby league players
Rugby union centres
Rugby league locks
Sydney Roosters (NRLW) players
Rugby league players from Sydney
Rugby union players from Sydney